Mataguayo–Guaicuru, Mataco–Guaicuru or Macro-Waikurúan is a proposed language family consisting of the Mataguayan and Guaicuruan languages. Pedro Viegas Barros claims to have demonstrated it. These languages are spoken in Argentina, Brazil, Paraguay, and Bolivia.

Genetic relations
Jorge Suárez linked Guaicuruan and Charruan in a Waikuru-Charrúa stock. Kaufman (2007: 72) has also added Lule–Vilela and Zamucoan, while Morris Swadesh proposed a Macro-Mapuche stock that included Matacoan, Guaicuruan, Charruan, and Mascoyan. Campbell (1997) has argued that those hypotheses should  be further investigated, though he no longer intends to evaluate it.

Language contact
Jolkesky (2016) notes that there are lexical similarities with the Arawakan, Tupian, Trumai, and Ofayé language families due to contact, pointing to an origin of Proto-Mataguayo-Guaicuruan in the Upper Paraguay River basin.

Classification
Internal classification by Jolkesky (2016):

(† = extinct)

Macro-Mataguayo-Guaykuru
Payagua †
Guachi †
Guaykuru
Kadiweu
Qom-Abipon
Abipon †
Qom
Qom, Southern: Mokovi
Qom, Northern: Pilaga; Toba
Mataguayo
Mataguayo, Western
Chorote: Chorote Iyojwa'ja; Chorote Iyo'wujwa
Wichi: Wichi Guisnay; Wichi Nokten; Wichi Vejoz
Mataguayo, Eastern
Maka
Nivakle

Chaco linguistic area

Campbell and Grondona (2012) consider the languages to be part of a Chaco linguistic area. Common Chaco areal features include SVO word order and active-stative verb alignment.

See also
Gran Chaco people

References

 Greenberg, Joseph H. (1987). Language in the Americas. Stanford: Stanford University Press.
 Kaufman, Terrence. (1990). Language history in South America: What we know and how to know more. In D. L. Payne (Ed.), Amazonian linguistics: Studies in lowland South American languages (pp. 13–67). Austin: University of Texas Press. .
 Kaufman, Terrence. (1994). The native languages of South America. In C. Mosley & R. E. Asher (Eds.), Atlas of the world's languages (pp. 46–76). London: Routledge.

 
Proposed language families
Chaco linguistic area